The 2018 Rugby League European Championship B (also known as Euro B) was ninth edition of the Rugby League European Championship B and acted as the second phase of European qualifying to the 2021 Rugby League World Cup. The series involved three teams in pool play and took place in October 2018. The two highest ranked teams, Russia and Spain, advanced to the European play-off.  In August 2019, Russia withdrew from the play-off tournament and were replace by Serbia.

Standings

Fixtures

Serbia were without their Australian-based players, David Andjelić, Brandon Janjić, Jonathan Kress, and Ilija Radan, along with head coach Brett Davidson due to VISA issues. The Serbian Rugby League allege that Russia's Association of Rugby League Clubs did not provide the necessary paperwork for VISA removal.

References

European rugby league competitions
2018 in rugby league
2021 Rugby League World Cup